Katriona Allen (born 13 October 1997) is an English born Scottish professional squash player who currently plays for Scotland women's national squash team. She achieved her highest career PSA singles ranking of 114 in February 2020 as a part of the 2019-20 PSA World Tour.

References

External links 

 Profile at PSA
 

1997 births
Living people
Scottish female squash players